Langsdorfia tessellata is a moth in the family Cossidae first described by E. Dukinfield Jones in 1912. It is found in Brazil.

References

Hypoptinae